The Crane Flat Fire Lookout in Yosemite National Park was built in 1931. An example of the National Park Service Rustic style, the lookout is a two-story structure with a lower storage or garage level and an upper observation level, with an overhanging roof. Design work was carried out by the National Park Service Landscape Division.

The lookout was the first in Yosemite, and was still in use in the 1980s. It was designed in the National Park Service Rustic style, and is one of only four similar structures in California, with the Henness Ridge Fire Lookout being the only other in Yosemite. These lookouts were specifically designed to blend with their surroundings, in contrast to the metal towers used by the U.S. Forest Service. The Crane Flat lookout was included in an influential portfolio of park structures assembled by Thomas Chalmers Vint, chief landscape architect of the National Park Service, to be used as prototypes for general use.

See also
National Register of Historic Places listings in Yosemite National Park
Architects of the National Park Service
National Register of Historic Places listings in Mariposa County, California

References

Fire lookout towers in California
Fire lookout towers on the National Register of Historic Places
Towers completed in 1931
Park buildings and structures on the National Register of Historic Places in California
National Register of Historic Places in Mariposa County, California
National Register of Historic Places in Yosemite National Park
National Park Service rustic in Yosemite National Park
1931 establishments in California